David Schnegg (born 29 September 1998) is an Austrian professional footballer who plays as a left-back for Sturm Graz.

Club career
Schnegg started playing football for FG Schönwies/Mils and for the Academy Tyrol. 2017– 2018 he played for SC Imst in the Tyrol League, the 4th level in Austrian football. In January 2018 he went on to WSG Wattens in the Erste Liga.

He made his professional debut playing for WSG Wattens against FC Wacker Innsbruck on 9 March 2018.

For the 2018–19 season he went to FC Liefering.

On 17 August 2020, he returned to WSG Swarovski Tirol on a season-long loan.

Schnegg moved to Italian club Venezia in June 2021. On 15 January 2022, he joined Crotone on loan.

On 15 June 2022, Schnegg returned to Austria and signed a four-year contract with Sturm Graz.

Career statistics

References

External links

1998 births
Living people
Footballers from Salzburg
Austrian footballers
Austria under-21 international footballers
Association football midfielders
WSG Tirol players
FC Liefering players
FC Juniors OÖ players
LASK players
Venezia F.C. players
F.C. Crotone players
SK Sturm Graz players
2. Liga (Austria) players
Austrian Football Bundesliga players
Serie A players
Serie B players
Austrian expatriate footballers
Expatriate footballers in Italy
Austrian expatriate sportspeople in Italy